An obayifo is a vampire/witch-like mythological creature from West Africa coming from the folklore of the Ashanti. In Ashanti folklore, obayifo are very common and may inhabit the bodies of any man or woman. They are described as having shifty eyes and being obsessed with food. When travelling at night they are said to emit a phosphorescent light from their armpits and anus. The obayifo is known as a similar entity to the asiman by the Dahomey people, a creature that can shapeshift and fly, turning itself into a ball of light and hunting for prey in the night sky.

Origin 
In Ashanti Twi, the word used to describe "witchcraft" is bayi. Despite this, the etymology of bayi is still uncertain. Another possible variation is oba meaning "child" and yi meaning to remove. "To remove a child" in this case highlights a close association of infant mortality and fertility to the likes of witchcraft. Alternatively, bayi also may have a history in representing blood or family lineage. People, typically women, who practiced bayi turned into the obayifo. Although obayifo is used to describe both the men and women who practiced bayi and turned into the monster, a distinction can be drawn between the men and women who practiced bayi, as obansam, meaning wizard, was a term used for the males exclusively as obayifo was sometimes only used for women exclusively.

See also
Asanbosam
Adze
Soucouyant

References
“Africa, Vampires In.” The Free Dictionary, Farlex, https://encyclopedia2.thefreedictionary.com/Africa%2C+Vampires+in. 

Allman, Jean Marie, and John Parker. Tongnaab: The History of a West African God. Indiana University Press, 2006. 

West African legendary creatures
African witchcraft
Ghanaian culture
Ivorian culture
Togolese culture
Vampires